The 2021 F4 Spanish Championship was the sixth season of the Spanish F4 Championship. It was a multi-event motor racing championship for open wheel, formula racing cars regulated according to FIA Formula 4 regulations, based in Spain. The championship featured drivers competing in 1.4 litre Tatuus-Abarth single seat race cars that conformed to the technical regulations for the championship. The series was organised by RFEDA.

This was the last season of using Tatuus F4-T014 car. Starting from the next season, the series will feature Tatuus F4 T-021.

Entry list

Race calendar and results 
5 rounds organized by RFEDA were announced on 17 October 2020. Another 2 rounds set to take place abroad were revealed on 19 October with their places and dates to be confirmed. An updated version with the round at Circuit de Spa-Francorchamps and one in Portugal added was published on 17 December 2020. Moreover, there were some tweaks to the dates of the national rounds. Autódromo Internacional do Algarve as the host of the Portuguese round was confirmed on 28 January 2021. Due to more travel restrictions, the planned season opener at Circuito del Jarama in April was cancelled and replaced with a round at Circuito de Navarra in May. As the official pre-season test of FIA World Endurance Championship was scheduled to take place at Circuit de Spa-Francorchamps and 24H Series moved its round to Circuit Paul Ricard, the series season opener will be held one week later at the same location.

Results 
Races denoted with a blue background were 18-minute races, which yield less points than 25-minute races.

Championship standings 
Points were awarded to the top ten classified finishers in 25-minute races and for the top eight classified finishers in 18-minute races.

Drivers' championship

Secondary Classes' standings

Teams' standings 
Two best finishers scored points for their team. Bonus points were not counted.

Notes

References

External links 

 

Spanish
Spanish F4 Championship seasons
F4
Spanish F4